The Thomas Raddall Atlantic Fiction Award is a Canadian literary award administered by the Atlantic Book Awards & Festival for the best work of adult fiction published in the previous year by a writer from the Atlantic provinces. The prize honours Thomas Head Raddall and is supported by an endowment he willed to it. The Award is currently worth $25,000.

Winners
1991 - Wayne Johnston, The Divine Ryans
1992 - Herb Curtis, The Last Tasmanian
1993 - John Steffler, The Afterlife of George Cartwright
1994 - David Adams Richards, For Those Who Hunt the Wounded Down
1995 - Bernice Morgan, Waiting for Time
1996 - M. T. Dohaney, Marriage of Masks
1997 - Alfred Silver, Acadia
1998 - Shree Ghatage, Awake When All the World is Asleep
1999 - Wayne Johnston, The Colony of Unrequited Dreams
2000 - Alistair MacLeod, No Great Mischief
2001 - Carol Bruneau, Purple for Sky
2002 - Michael Crummey, River Thieves
2003 - Donna Morrissey, Downhill Chance
2004 - Kenneth J. Harvey, The Town That Forgot How to Breathe
2005 - Edward Riche, The Nine Planets
2006 - Donna Morrissey, Sylvanus Now
2007 - Linda Little, Scotch River
2008 - Don Hannah, Ragged Islands
2009 - Douglas Arthur Brown, Quintet
2010 - Shandi Mitchell, Under This Unbroken Sky
2011 - Kathleen Winter, Annabel
2012 - David Adams Richards, Incidents in the Life of Markus Paul
2013 - Russell Wangersky, Whirl Away
2014 - William Kowalski, The Hundred Hearts
2015 - Darren Greer, Just Beneath My Skin
2016 - R. W. Gray, Entropic
2017 - Donna Morrissey, The Fortunate Brother
2018 - Oisin Curran, Blood Fable
2019 - Lisa Moore, Something for Everyone
2020 - Michael Crummey, The Innocents
2021 - Anne Simpson, Speechless

References

External links
Thomas Head Raddall Atlantic Fiction Award

Atlantic Book Awards
Awards established in 1991
1991 establishments in Nova Scotia
Canadian fiction awards